Cass is the given name of:

People:
 Cass Ballenger (1926–2015), U.S. Representative, 1986–2005
 Cass Browne (born 1971), English rock drummer
 Cass Canfield (1897–1986), American publishing executive
 Cass Daley (1915–1975), American actress, singer and comedian
 Cass Elliot (1941–1974), American singer with the Mamas & the Papas, born Ellen Naomi Cohen
 Cass Fox (born 1982), English singer who originally performed as "Cass"
 Cass Gilbert (1859–1934), American architect
 Cass McCombs (born 1977), American singer, songwriter and musician
 Cass Michaels (1926–1982), American Major League Baseball player
 Cass Pennant (born 1958), English writer and former football hooligan
 Cass Phang (born 1969), retired Cantopop singer from Hong Kong
 Cassandra Ponti (born 1980), Filipino actress and contestant in Pinoy Big Brother
 Cass Sunstein (born 1954), American legal scholar and professor

Fictional characters:
 the title character of the Sinclair Lewis novel and film Cass Timberlane 
 Cass Winthrop, a character in the American television soap opera Another World
 Castiel (Supernatural), a character in the American television series Supernatural